Venustiano Carranza is a small city located in the northwestern part of the Mexican state of Michoacán, in the region of the Chapala Lake. The city is still better known for its former pre-Mexican revolution name San Pedro Cahro, which derives from the town's patron saint and the last name of its original founders. Important spots in the town near the central square include a 17th-century church which has a clock tower. La Plaza is a town square structure that was recently renovated in 2005, which is packed on Sundays and town holidays and El Arco. There is a main farmer's market next to the municipal building and also a supermarket across the street.  You can see mountains in the southeast part of  town rumored to have a huge cross on a spot were La Virgin de Gaudalupe was seen.

San Pedro Cahro is the hometown to many residents that are scattered all over the US  with some concentrations in cities and suburbs like New York, Hawaiian Gardens, California; Chicago, Illinois; Fresno, California; Bakersfield, California; East Los Angeles, California; and Phoenix, Arizona; this is mostly due to the high unemployment in the region, but this little town is kind and people there are friendly, welcoming people.

In July 2017, reports circulated that a volcano might be forming in the Pueblo Viejo community. The reports were based on earth cracks filled with ash that formed in a soccer field. Experts from National Autonomous University of Mexico concluded that the high temperatures were caused by composting of buried organic material, not volcanism. The purported volcano was linked with the 20th century volcano Parícutin. Venustiano Carranza is located near the edge of the Michoacán-Guanajuato volcanic field, which includes Parícutin, although Parícutin itself is about  distant.

Events

From 21 to 29 June each year, a 9-day festival is celebrated commemorating the founding of the town and its patron or saint San Pedro. During the Christmas and Holy Week holidays many festivals are celebrated as well.

See also
Sahuayo, neighboring city

References

Populated places in Michoacán